The Punjab Regiment is an infantry regiment of the Pakistan Army. The regiment takes its name from the historic Punjab region, which is now divided into the Punjab province of Pakistan and the Indian states of Punjab, Haryana and Himachal Pradesh. It was raised in its current form in 1956, following the amalgamation of the 1st, 14th, 15th and 16th Punjab regiments that were inherited by the Dominion of Pakistan from the British Indian Army upon the Partition of India. Since then, the regiment has expanded in size to 63 battalions.

It is the oldest regiment in the Pakistan Army, tracing its lineage to as far back as 1751, during the reign of the Mughal Empire. The regiment's battalions have a distinguished record of military service, spanning the rise and decline of British colonial rule in South Asia, both World War I and World War II, as well as post-independence Pakistan.

Early history 
 The Punjab Regiment of Pakistan traces its origins back to the Madras Army of the British East India Company. The senior-most battalion of the 1st Punjab Regiment (which existed separately before 1956) was raised in 1759 as the 3rd Battalion of Coast Sepoys, and became the oldest-surviving infantry battalion of the erstwhile British Indian Army. Their first major engagement saw a decisive victory at the Battle of Wandiwash in 1760, when the British East India Company, led by Sir Eyre Coote, effectively ended French colonial ambitions in South Asia. All of the regiment's battalions subsequently played an important role in the early military campaigns of the East India Company and were actively engaged in the wars against the French, the Kingdom of Mysore and the Maratha Empire.

The numbers and titles of the battalions changed during the successive reorganizations of the Madras Presidency Army, the British Indian Army and the Indian Army during the 18th, 19th and 20th centuries. The names changed from Coast Sepoys to Carnatic Infantry, Madras Native Infantry, Punjabis and finally to the Punjab Regiment. After the Indian Rebellion of 1857, the new colonial administration applied the martial races concept, following which north Indian soldiers overwhelmingly supplanted the south Indians. The regiment was eventually renamed to the Punjab Regiment.

British Raj 

Following the British Crown's takeover of rule over British India from the East India Company in 1858, the Punjab regiments played a role in numerous conflicts across the world involving the British Empire. Various battalions were deployed to regions of British interest, ranging from modern-day China, Egypt, Burma and erstwhile Abyssinia.

Between 1903 and 1922, the British Indian Army included 28 numbered Punjabi Regiments. In 1922, these were amalgamated into six numbered regiments, namely:

 1st Punjab Regiment 
 2nd Punjab Regiment 
 8th Punjab Regiment 
 14th Punjab Regiment 
 15th Punjab Regiment 
 16th Punjab Regiment 
These regiments would all play a prominent role during World War II. From the 14th Punjab Regiment, the 1st and 5th battalions were deployed in Malaya during the opening stages of the Southeast Asian theatre. The 1st Battalion, under the command of Lieutenant-Colonel James Fitzpatrick, was overrun by Imperial Japanese forces at Changlun during the Battle of Jitra. With only 270 survivors, the 1st Battalion was not reformed during the rest of the campaign. The 5th Battalion, under the command of Lieutenant-Colonel Cyril Livesy Lawrence Stokes, performed relatively well in the British invasion of Japanese Thailand in early December 1941. However, Stokes died in Japanese captivity on 15 February 1942, following the Battle of Slim River. The 5/14th Punjabis was forced to surrender along with the rest of the British Commonwealth forces after the Fall of Singapore to the Empire of Japan on 15 February 1942. However, a number of the Indian troops from both battalions later joined the Japanese-backed Indian National Army, and formed a part of the Hindustan Field Force.

Partition of India and independence

In 1947, the British Raj announced the independence of British India, which would be split into two separate countries: a Hindu-majority India and a Muslim-majority Pakistan. Likewise, the British Indian Army was also to be divided between the two states. Out of the six existing Punjab Regiments, the 1st Punjab, 8th, 14th, 15th and 16th were allotted to the newly raised Pakistan Army, while the 2nd went to the Indian Army.

The Punjab Regiment of the Pakistan Army was raised in its present form in 1956, when four of the five Punjab Regiments allocated to Pakistan were merged into a unified unit.

Punjab Regiments allocated to Pakistan in 1947 (now part of the Pakistan Army Punjab Regiment)

1st Punjab Regiment
8th Punjab Regiment – Amalgamated with the 10th Baluch Regiment and Bahawalpur Regiment to form the present-day Baloch Regiment
14th Punjab Regiment
15th Punjab Regiment
16th Punjab Regiment

The line up for the new regiment was:
1 Punjab – 1/1st Punjab
2 Punjab – 2/1st Punjab
3 Punjab – 3/1st Punjab
4 Punjab – 5/1st Punjab
5 Punjab – 1/14th Punjab
6 Punjab – 2/14th Punjab (Duke of Cambridge's Own)
7 Punjab – 3/14th Punjab
8 Punjab – 4/14th Punjab
9 Punjab – 1/15th Punjab
10 Punjab – 2/15th Punjab
11 Punjab – 3/15th Punjab
12 Punjab – 4/15th Punjab
13 Punjab – 1/16th Punjab
14 Punjab – 2/16th Punjab
15 Punjab – 3/16th Punjab
16 Punjab – 5/14th Punjab (Pathans)
17 Punjab – 4/16th Punjab (Bhopal)
18 Punjab – 7/1st Punjab
19 Punjab – 7/16th Punjab
20 Punjab – 14/1st Punjab

Punjab Regiments allocated to India in 1947 (now part of the Indian Army Punjab Regiment)
2nd Punjab Regiment

The 1st Punjab's regimental centre was located in the city of Jhelum. In early September 1947, Pakistani personnel arrived from the 2nd Punjab's regimental centre in Meerut (present-day Uttar Pradesh, India) and Indian personnel were dispatched to either the 11th Sikhs or the 6th Rajputanas regimental centres depending on whether they were Sikhs or Hindu Rajputs.

The Punjab Regiment at its height totalled 58 battalions; however, 11 were transferred in 1980 to the Pakistan Army's newly raised Sind Regiment.

Class and religious composition
Before the Partition of India in 1947, the ethno-religious composition of the Punjab Regiment consisted of: Punjabi Muslims (50%); Punjabi Hindus (40%); Punjabi Sikhs (10%). Following the regiment's transfer to the Pakistan Army, it became largely religiously homogenous, comprising mostly Muslims with around 20% ethnic Pashtuns and 80% Punjabis.

Colonel-in-chief
Since the creation of Pakistan in 1947, the Punjab Regiment has seen the appointment of four colonel-in-chiefs;

 Field Marshal Ayub Khan, 5th Punjab
 General Asif Nawaz, 5th Punjab
 General Aziz Khan, 12th Punjab
 General Khalid Shameem, 20th Punjab

Recipients of the Nishan-e-Haider 
The Nishan-e-Haider is the highest gallantry award awarded by Pakistan to those who show an incredible amount of valour and courage on the battlefield in the face of staunch adversity. To date, only ten soldiers have been awarded this honour, of which four belonged to the Punjab Regiment:

 Captain Muhammad Sarwar, 2nd Punjabis (1910 – July 27, 1948)

 Major Muhammad Tufail, 13th Punjabis (1943 – August 7, 1958)

 Major Aziz Bhatti, 17th Punjabis (1928 – September 10, 1965)

 Naïk Muhammad Mahfuz, 15th Punjabis (1944 – December 17, 1971)

As a form of respect, deceased recipients are given the honorary title of Shaheed, which denotes martyrdom, whilst living recipients are dubbed Ghazi, the Islamic term for warrior.

Notable former personnel

 
Field Marshal Ayub Khan Tareen, N.Pk., H.aPk., HJ - 5 Punjab  
General Asif Nawaz Janjua - 5 Punjab
General Muhammad Shariff - 3 Punjab
General Aziz Khan, NI(M), SBt, HI(M) - 12 Punjab
General Khalid Shameem Wynne, NI(M) - 20 Punjab
Major Malik Munawar Khan Awan, SJ, King of Rajouri (reposted to 21 AK regt from 5 Punjab).
Lieutenant General Aftab Ahmad Khan
Lieutenant General Tariq Pervez Khan, Escaped from Fathergarh (India) - 6 Punjab
Lieutenant General Masood Aslam, HI, HI(M), SJ - 4 Punjab
Lieutenant General Amir Abdullah Khan Niazi, HJ& Bar, MC 2 Punjab & 5 Punjab
Major General Adam Khan[MC] 2 Punjab
Major General Sher Ali Khan Pataudi, HJ 1st Punjab
Lieutenant General Shahid Baig Mirza HI(M) , 11 Punjab 27th Punjabis 
Lieutenant General Asim Saleem Bajwa, TBt - 34 Punjab
Lieutenant General Zaheerul Islam - 13 Punjab
Lieutenant Colonel Ghulam Hussain Chaudry, HJ - 3 Punjab
Major Raja Nadir Pervez, SJ & Bar - 6 Punjab
Major Tufail Mohammad Shaheed, NH - 13 Punjab
Major Raja Aziz Bhatti Shaheed, NH - 17 Punjab
Captain Muhammad Sarwar Shaheed, NH - 2 Punjab
Captain Ishar Singh, VC, OBI - 12 Punjab (28th Punjabis)
Lieutenant Karamjeet Singh Judge, VC 12 Punjab (4/15th Punjab)
Jemadar Abdul Latif Khan Tarin, IDSM, 82nd Punjabis. 
Lance Naik Muhammad Mahfuz Shaheed, NH - 15 Punjab
Lance Naik Sher Shah, VC - 19 Punjab
Naik Gian Singh, VC
Naik Shahamad Khan, VC, 89th Punjabis.

Col. S.G. Mehdi M.C, ex-Group Commander SSG; - 15 Punjab
Lieutenant General KM Azhar Khan, HI, HI(M)] - 18 Punjab, The Desert Hawks Battalion]
Lieutenant General Arif Hayat, [HI(M)] - 18 Punjab, The Desert Hawks Battalion]
Lieutenant General Asif Yasin Malik, HI, HI(M)
lieutenant General M.Arif Bangash - 3 Punjab
Lieutenant General Humayoun Khan Bangash
Major General Tahir Masood Bhutta, 54 Punjab
Major General Abid Ejaz Kahlon, HI(M) - 18 Punjab, The Desert Hawks Battalion]
Major General Haroon sikandar Pasha, 20 Punjab
Major General Muhammad Mushtaq, HI, H
Brigadier Raja Habib ur Rahman, - 5 Punjab
Brigadier Nusrat Khan Sial, [Sitara - e - Basalat], S(Bt) - 35 Punjab
Major Farook Adam,SJ - 2 Punjab
Captain Raja Khawar Shahab Shaheed, 35 Punjab.
Captain Abdul Jalil Orakzai Shaheed 3rd Punjab Regiment at Kali-dhar AJK 1965 War

Current units
It is the largest infantry regiment of the Pakistan Army, consisting of 34 battalions.

 1st Battalion
 2nd Battalion
 3rd Battalion
 4th Battalion
 5th Battalion
 6th Battalion
 7th Battalion
 8th Battalion
 9th Battalion
 10th Battalion
 11th Battalion
 12th Battalion
 13th Battalion
 14th Battalion
 15th Battalion
 16th Battalion
 17th Battalion
 18th Battalion
 22nd Battalion

 25th Battalion
 29th Battalion
 31st Battalion
 32nd Battalion
 36th Battalion
 37th Battalion
 38th Battalion
 39th Battalion
 41st Battalion
 46th Battalion
 54th Battalion
 56th Battalion 
 57th Battalion
 59th Battalion
 61st Battalion
 63rd Battalion
 67th Battalion (Light Anti-Tank)
 69th Battalion
 84th Battalion

Affiliated units
 20th Lancers
 42nd Lancers
 Punjab Light Commando Battalion

Alliances 
 1st Bn with The Royal Irish Regiment (27th (Inniskilling) 83rd, 87th and Ulster Defence Regiment)
 8th Bn and 14th Bn with The Duke of Lancaster's Regiment (King's Lancashire and Border)
 12th, 14th, 15th, and 17th Bn with The Princess of Wales's Royal Regiment (Queen's and Royal Hampshires)
 13th Bn with The Mercian Regiment

See also
 Punjab Regiment (India)
 Azad Kashmir Regiment
 Baloch Regiment
 Frontier Force Regiment
 Northern Light Infantry Regiment
 Sindh Regiment

Notes

Further reading
 Brig. Syed Haider Abbas Rizvi (Ret.) (1984). Veteran campaigners: a history of the Punjab Regiment, 1759–1981 (Pakistan Army). Lahore: Wajidalis. A comprehensive and detailed history of the Punjab Regiment.

External links
 

 
Infantry regiments of Pakistan
British Indian Army infantry regiments
Honourable East India Company regiments
Military units and formations established in 1801
Military in Punjab, Pakistan